In the Domain Name System, a LOC record (experimental ) is a means for expressing geographic location information for a domain name.

It contains WGS84 Latitude, Longitude and Altitude (ellipsoidal height) information together with host/subnet physical size and location accuracy.   This information can be queried by other computers connected to the Internet.

Record format 

The LOC record is expressed in a master file in the following format:

<owner> <TTL> <class> LOC ( d1 [m1 [s1]] {"N"|"S"} d2 [m2 [s2]]
                            {"E"|"W"} alt["m"] [siz["m"] [hp["m"]
                            [vp["m"]]]] )

(The parentheses are used for multi-line data as specified in RFC 1035, section 5.1.)

where:

    d1:     [0 .. 90]            (degrees latitude)
    d2:     [0 .. 180]           (degrees longitude)
    m1, m2: [0 .. 59]            (minutes latitude/longitude)
    s1, s2: [0 .. 59.999]        (seconds latitude/longitude)
    alt:    [-100000.00 .. 42849672.95] BY .01 (altitude in meters)
    siz, hp, vp: [0 .. 90000000.00] (size/precision in meters)

An example DNS LOC resource record 

 statdns.net for the coordinates: 
LOC record statdns.net.   IN LOC   52 22 23.000 N 4 53 32.000 E -2.00m 0.00m 10000m 10m

Altitude for Geosynchronous Earth Satellites 

The altitude range provides the following:

 DNS altitude range [-100000.00 .. 42849672.95].  This range can be easily stored in 4 bytes.
 Maximum altitude is 42,849.67295 km.  Which is large enough to store the altitude of a circular geosynchronous orbit (i.e. approximately 35,790 km above mean sea level).
 Maximum depth of 100 km below earth surface (approximated by the WGS84 reference ellipsoid).

UK Postcode to DNS LOC record using find.me.uk 
You can look up the LOC record for any UK postcode, e.g.:
 $ dig loc SW1A2AA.find.me.uk
 SW1A2AA.find.me.uk.     2592000 IN      LOC     51 30 12.748 N 0 7 39.612 W 0.00

See also 

 List of DNS record types
 Geo (microformat)
 Geolocation
 Geolocation API
 ICBM address
 ISO 6709

References 
 Wikipedia:WikiProject Geographical coordinates The Wikipedia location resource.
 Sites supporting DNS LOC
  - How latitude and longitude are stored in a DNS record.
  Chapter 3.4.2: Text/directory MIME type GEO
  Section 6.5.2: GEO (obsoleted , updated by )

DNS record types
Internet geolocation